The 25th Bachsas Awards were given by Bangladesh Cholochitra Sangbadik Samity (Bangladesh Cine-Journalists' Association) to outstanding performers in film, television, music, dance and theatre in 2003. Awards was introduced in 1972 to encourage the fledgling film industry of the country.

List of Winners

Lifetime Achievement Awards
 Film – Subhash Dutta
 Music – Abdul Jabbar and Apel Mahmud

Honorary Awards
 Aziz Misir Critic Award – Dramatist Arun Chowdhury
 Honorary Award – Singer Mitali Mukherjee

Film

Telefilm

Drama serial

Drama

Television program
 Best Anchor – Hanif Sanket
 Best Magazine Show (Entertainment) – Ittyadi
 Best Talk Show (Educational) – Tritiyo Matra

Theatre
 Best Production – Trino Porney Shal Monjori
 Best Playwright – Dr Syed Manzurul Islam
 Best Set-design – Mustafa Manwar
 Best Theatre Group – Loko Natyadal Shiddheshwari
 Best Actress – Tropa Majumder
 Best Actor – SK Bokhari

Music
 Best Male Singer – Asif Akbar
 Best Female Singer – Dolly Shayantoni 
 Best Band – Hasan's Shadhinota
 Best Male Vocal – Ayub Bachchu
 Best Female Vocal – Tishma

References 

Bachsas Awards
Awards established in 1972